The Striped 2 was an ident used by BBC2 between 28 December 1974 and 18 June 1979. The ident featured a numeral 2 made out of horizontal lines.

Launch
In 1974, the new look was to replace the previous look which had been going in one form or another for seven years. The tenth anniversary of BBC2 was also that year, and so a new ident would have been greatly appreciated to celebrate the station. The new look would also coincide with the updated mirror globe look used by BBC1 and a new look to both channels as a whole.

Components of Look

The ident itself featured a numeral 2 made out of discs of alternating colour of white and light blue. these discs used to revolve: the light blue all moving to off to the left of the screen, white to the right before both sets reform the 2, by coming in from the opposite side they left by. This ident was usually on a background of navy blue, but black was also occasionally used. The ident was commonly believed to be caused by two rotating cylinders, however they were in fact formed by 23 stacked discs, each with a different line drawn on the outside. Each disc rotated in a different direction to the disc immediately above and below it, and had colour added through the NODD system that was used to make the BBC1 mirror globes.

A clock accompanied the look and featured a light blue face and hands with a white corporate BBC2 logo. The face included a "polo mint" centre circle from which the hands radiated out of, and counters that got progressively thicker the further round the clockface. This was either on a navy blue, or black background, depending on the ident that preceded or succeeded it.

Promotional style was varied and usually did not feature the 2, however this was not always the case. In c.1977, a double striped '2' started to appear on some captions, and it was this symbol that would form the basis of the next look. Unanimated, programme captions were used for programmes and featured the fully white striped '2' in the lower left corner with programme name beside it, all overlaid the picture.

Special Idents
Some special variations of the ident were used for specific programmes 
A version of the ident where the background was yellow, and the white lines were black, was used before a Shirley Bassey programme.
A variation was used to introduce Open Space, which featured the 2 revolving out, but a map of the UK reforming in its place.

Some information about Christmas idents during this period exists.
Christmas 1975 - The new double-striped '2' formed out of tinsel.
Christmas 1976 - A sequined layout version of the 2.
Christmas 1977 - A red 2, with lines following the body of the 2, rotates above a "Christmas" caption.
Christmas 1978 - Six medieval trumpeters, with the trumpet flags showing the new double-striped '2' logo.

References

External links

TVARK 1974 Idents
TVARK 1974 Continuity
TV Room 1974 Idents
MHP 1974 Idents
625: Andrew Wiseman's Television Room

BBC Two
BBC Idents
Television presentation in the United Kingdom